In propositional logic, modus ponens (MP), also known as modus ponendo ponens (Latin for "method of putting by placing"), implication elimination, or affirming the antecedent, is a deductive argument form and rule of inference. It can be summarized as "P implies Q. P is true. Therefore Q must also be true."

Modus ponens is closely related to another valid form of argument, modus tollens. Both have apparently similar but invalid forms such as affirming the consequent,  denying the antecedent, and evidence of absence. Constructive dilemma is the disjunctive version of modus ponens. Hypothetical syllogism is closely related to modus ponens and sometimes thought of as "double modus ponens."

The history of modus ponens goes back to antiquity. The first to explicitly describe the argument form modus ponens was Theophrastus. It, along with modus tollens, is one of the standard patterns of inference that can be applied to derive chains of conclusions that lead to the desired goal.

Explanation 

The form of a modus ponens argument resembles a syllogism, with two premises and a conclusion:

 If P, then Q.
 P.
 Therefore, Q.

The first premise is a conditional ("if–then") claim, namely that P implies Q. The second premise is an assertion that P, the antecedent of the conditional claim, is the case. From these two premises it can be logically concluded that Q, the consequent of the conditional claim, must be the case as well.

An example of an argument that fits the form modus ponens:

 If today is Tuesday, then John will go to work.
 Today is Tuesday.
 Therefore, John will go to work.

This argument is valid, but this has no bearing on whether any of the statements in the argument are actually true; for modus ponens to be a sound argument, the premises must be true for any true instances of the conclusion. An argument can be valid but nonetheless unsound if one or more premises are false; if an argument is valid and all the premises are true, then the argument is sound. For example, John might be going to work on Wednesday. In this case, the reasoning for John's going to work (because it is Wednesday) is unsound. The argument is only sound on Tuesdays (when John goes to work), but valid on every day of the week. A propositional argument using modus ponens is said to be deductive.

In single-conclusion sequent calculi, modus ponens is the Cut rule. The cut-elimination theorem for a calculus says that every proof involving Cut can be transformed (generally, by a constructive method) into a proof without Cut, and hence that Cut is admissible.

The Curry–Howard correspondence between proofs and programs relates modus ponens to function application:  if f is a function of type P → Q and x is of type P, then f x is of type Q.

In artificial intelligence, modus ponens is often called forward chaining.

Formal notation 

The modus ponens rule may be written in sequent notation as

where P, Q and P → Q are statements (or propositions) in a formal language and ⊢ is a metalogical symbol meaning that Q is a syntactic consequence of P and P → Q in some logical system.

Justification via truth table
The validity of modus ponens in classical two-valued logic can be clearly demonstrated by use of a truth table.

In instances of modus ponens we assume as premises that p → q is true and p is true. Only one line of the truth table—the first—satisfies these two conditions (p  and p → q). On this line, q is also true. Therefore, whenever p → q is true and p is true, q must also be true.

Status 

While modus ponens is one of the most commonly used argument forms in logic it must not be mistaken for a logical law; rather, it is one of the accepted mechanisms for the construction of deductive proofs that includes the "rule of definition" and the "rule of substitution". Modus ponens allows one to eliminate a conditional statement from a logical proof or argument (the antecedents) and thereby not carry these antecedents forward in an ever-lengthening string of symbols; for this reason modus ponens is sometimes called the rule of detachment or the law of detachment. Enderton, for example, observes that "modus ponens can produce shorter formulas from longer ones", and Russell observes that "the process of the inference cannot be reduced to symbols. Its sole record is the occurrence of ⊦q [the consequent] ... an inference is the dropping of a true premise; it is the dissolution of an implication".

A justification for the "trust in inference is the belief that if the two former assertions [the antecedents] are not in error, the final assertion [the consequent] is not in error". In other words: if one statement or proposition implies a second one, and the first statement or proposition is true, then the second one is also true. If P implies Q and  P is true, then Q is true.

Correspondence to other mathematical frameworks

Algebraic semantics

In mathematical logic,  algebraic semantics treats every sentence as a name for an element in an ordered set. Typically, the set can be visualized as a  lattice-like structure with a single element (the “always-true”) at the top and another single element (the “always-false”) at the bottom. Logical implication becomes a matter of relative position:  logically implies  just in case , i.e., when either  or else  lies below  and is connected to it by an upward path.

In this context, to say that  and  together imply —that is, to affirm modus ponens as valid—is to say that . In the semantics for basic propositional logic, the algebra is  Boolean, with  construed as the material conditional: . Confirming that  is then straightforward, because .

Probability calculus
Modus ponens represents an instance of the Law of total probability which for a binary variable is expressed as:

,

Assume that  is equivalent to  being TRUE, and that  is equivalent to  being FALSE. Hence, the law of total probability represents a generalization of modus ponens.

Subjective logic
Modus ponens represents an instance of the binomial deduction operator in subjective logic expressed as:

,

The deduction operator  of subjective logic produces an absolute TRUE deduced opinion  when the conditional opinion  is absolute TRUE and the antecedent opinion  is absolute TRUE. Hence, subjective logic deduction represents a generalization of both modus ponens and the Law of total probability.

Alleged cases of failure

Philosophers and linguists have identified a variety of cases where modus ponens appears to fail. Vann McGee, for instance, argued that modus ponens can fail for conditionals whose consequents are themselves conditionals. The following is an example:

 Either Shakespeare or Hobbes wrote Hamlet.
 If either Shakespeare or Hobbes wrote Hamlet, then if Shakespeare didn't do it, Hobbes did.
 Therefore, if Shakespeare didn't write Hamlet, Hobbes did it.

Since Shakespeare did write Hamlet, the first premise is true. The second premise is also true, since starting with a set of possible authors limited to just Shakespeare and Hobbes and eliminating one of them leaves only the other. However, the conclusion may seem false, since ruling out Shakespeare as the author of Hamlet would leave numerous possible candidates, many of them more plausible alternatives than Hobbes.

The general form of McGee-type counterexamples to modus ponens is simply , therefore ; it is not essential that  be a disjunction, as in the example given. That these kinds of cases constitute failures of modus ponens remains a controversial view among logicians, but opinions vary on how the cases should be disposed of.

In deontic logic, some examples of conditional obligation also raise the possibility of modus ponens failure. These are cases where the conditional premise describes an obligation predicated on an immoral or imprudent action, e.g., “If Doe murders his mother, he ought to do so gently,” for which the dubious unconditional conclusion would be "Doe ought to gently murder his mother." It would appear to follow that if Doe is in fact gently murdering his mother, then by modus ponens he is doing exactly what he should, unconditionally, be doing. Here again, modus ponens failure is not a popular diagnosis but is sometimes argued for.

Possible fallacies
The fallacy of affirming the consequent is a common misinterpretation of the modus ponens.

See also

References

Sources 
Herbert B. Enderton, 2001, A Mathematical Introduction to Logic Second Edition, Harcourt Academic Press, Burlington MA, .
 Audun Jøsang, 2016, Subjective Logic; A formalism for Reasoning Under Uncertainty Springer, Cham, 
Alfred North Whitehead and Bertrand Russell 1927 Principia Mathematica to *56 (Second Edition) paperback edition 1962, Cambridge at the University Press, London UK. No ISBN, no LCCCN.
Alfred Tarski 1946 Introduction to Logic and to the Methodology of the Deductive Sciences 2nd Edition, reprinted by Dover Publications, Mineola NY.  (pbk).

External links 

 Modus ponens at Wolfram MathWorld

Rules of inference
Latin logical phrases
Theorems in propositional logic
Classical logic